Brave Bull Creek is a stream in the U.S. state of South Dakota.

Brave Bull Creek has the name of a local Sioux Indian.

See also
List of rivers of South Dakota

References

Rivers of Haakon County, South Dakota
Rivers of Jackson County, South Dakota
Rivers of South Dakota